The World Fast Draw Association (WFDA) is the largest international sanctioning body in the shooting sport of fast draw, with active members in the United States, Canada, Japan, Korea, the United Kingdom and Germany.  In addition to keeping records and presenting awards, the Association publishes a monthly magazine detailing the sport.  The organization is associated with the National Rifle Association of America.

See also 
 List of shooting sports organizations

References 

Shooting sports organizations